Andrew!!! is a studio album by American jazz pianist Andrew Hill recorded for Blue Note Records in 1964, but not released until April 1968, and subsequently reissued on CD in 2005 with two alternate takes. It features Hill with vibraphonist Bobby Hutcherson, bassist Richard Davis and drummer Joe Chambers, along with tenor saxophonist John Gilmore, in a rare session away from the Sun Ra Arkestra.

Track listing 
All compositions by Andrew Hill
 "The Griots" - 6:04
 "Black Monday" - 8:55
 "Duplicity" - 6:11
 "Le Serpent Qui Danse" - 6:55
 "No Doubt" - 4:23
 "Symmetry" - 7:08
 "The Griots" [alternate] - 5:06
 "Symmetry" [alternate] - 6:31

Personnel 
 Andrew Hill - piano
 John Gilmore - tenor saxophone
 Bobby Hutcherson - vibraphone
 Richard Davis - double-bass
 Joe Chambers - drums

References 

1968 albums
Andrew Hill albums
Blue Note Records albums
Post-bop albums
Albums produced by Alfred Lion
Avant-garde jazz albums
Albums recorded at Van Gelder Studio